Cui Zhide (born 11 January 1983, in Henan) is a Chinese race walker.

Achievements

References

1983 births
Living people
Chinese male racewalkers
Athletes from Henan